The Georges Leygues class (Type C70 AS or Type F70 AS) was a class of anti-submarine destroyers of the French Navy. They were multi-role ships due to their Exocet and Crotale missile armament, making them especially suitable for the defence of strategic positions, show of force operations, or as high seas escorts. The design was initially officially known as a "corvette" with the designation C70, but were internationally labelled an "anti-submarine destroyer" (hence the "D" in the hull numbers). Subsequently, the French referred to the ships as "frigates" with the designation F70.

Design
The superstructures were built to optimise resistance to the blast from nuclear explosions. The last three ships of the class had their bridges raised one deck to overcome problems experienced by the first four in bad weather, as well as being equipped with DSBV 61 passive linear towed array sonar and several other upgraded systems.

Ships in class

See also
 List of naval ship classes in service

References

External links
ASM type F70 – Marine nationale official site 

 
 
 
Frigate classes
Ship classes of the French Navy